Amanethes is the ninth studio album by Swedish gothic metal band Tiamat. It was released on May 2, 2008. The album was more positively received than Tiamat's previous releases, in part because of its return to their earlier metal sound in a few songs, while keeping the gothic rock in other songs.

Track listing

All tracks by Johan Edlund except "Amanes" (lyrics by J. Edlund, music by J. Edlund & A. Iwers)

 "The Temple of the Crescent Moon" – 5:33
 "Equinox of the Gods" – 4:35
 "Until the Hellhounds Sleep Again" – 4:07
 "Will They Come?" – 5:13
 "Lucienne" – 4:41
 "Summertime Is Gone" – 3:53
 "Katarraktis Apo Aima" – 2:43
 "Raining Dead Angels" – 4:18
 "Misantropolis" – 4:13
 "Amanitis" – 3:21
 "Meliae" – 6:11
 "Via Dolorosa" – 4:05
 "Circles" – 3:45
 "Amanes" – 5:30
 "Thirst Snake" (digipack bonus track) - 5:00

Personnel 

 Johan Edlund – vocals, electric & acoustic guitars, keys, bouzouki, percussion
Thomas Wyreson - electric & acoustic guitars
 Anders Iwers – bass
 Lars Sköld – drums

Additional vocals by Ireth & Katerina Papageorgiou.

Backing vocals by Johan Edlund, Thomas Wyreson & Ireth.

Outro vocals on "Equinox of the Gods" by Leopold Ozzy Wyreson.

Charts

References

Tiamat (band) albums
2008 albums
Gothic rock albums by Swedish artists